Duany is a surname. Notable people with the surname include:

Andrés Duany (born 1949), American architect, urban planner, and a founder of the Congress for the New Urbanism
Claro Duany (1917–1997), Cuban professional baseball player
Demetrio Castillo Duany (1856–1922), Cuban revolutionary, soldier, and politician
Ger Duany (born 1978), South Sudanese actor and model based in the United States
Kueth Duany (born 1980), Sudanese-born former basketball player living in the United States
Raúl Duany (born 1975), Cuban decathlete

See also
Duani